Pascal Olmeta (born 7 April 1961 in Bastia) is a French former professional footballer who played as a goalkeeper for Olympique de Marseille and Olympique Lyonnais in the 1990s.

Olmeta is good friends with Eric Cantona and has played in two testimonials for the Rest of the World against Manchester United: he played in the Munich testimonial in 1998 and also Sir Alex Ferguson's testimonial in 1999. In 2010, Olmeta played in goal for United in a charity game in aid of Sport Relief.

He represented France in the Beach Soccer World Cup 2001 and was awarded the title of 'Best Goalkeeper' in the tournament.

Personal life
Olmeta is married with two daughters.

In 2016, Olmeta drew criticism after video footage from 2011 surfaced showing him shooting an elephant in the head before posing "proudly" with the corpse. He defended the footage stating he had shot the animal because of overpopulation in Zimbabwe, and all income from hunting was being used to help local people.

References

External links
 

Living people
1961 births
Sportspeople from Bastia
Association football goalkeepers
French footballers
France under-21 international footballers
UEFA Champions League winning players
Ligue 1 players
INF Vichy players
SC Bastia players
SC Toulon players
Racing Club de France Football players
Olympique de Marseille players
Olympique Lyonnais players
La Liga players
RCD Espanyol footballers
Gazélec Ajaccio players
French expatriate footballers
Expatriate footballers in Spain
French expatriate sportspeople in Spain
La Ferme Célébrités participants
French beach soccer players
Beach soccer goalkeepers
Footballers from Corsica